Utpal is a given name. Notable people with the name include:

Utpal Banerjee (born 1957), Professor of the Department of Molecular, Cell and Developmental Biology at UCLA
Utpal K. Banerjee, Indian writer, adviser on management and information technology
Utpal Kumar Basu (1939–2015), Bengali poet and story teller
Utpal Bhadra, retired scientist, worked in the Centre for Cellular and Molecular Biology (CCMB) in Hyderabad, India
Utpal Bhattacharya, finance professor at the Hong Kong University of Science and Technology
Utpal Bhayani (1953–2019), Gujarati language story writer, playwright, critic and translator from Gujarat, India
Utpal Borah, Bharatiya Janata Party politician from Assam
Utpal Borpujari, double National Film Award winner; one, as a film critic, and the other, as a filmmaker
Utpal Chatterjee (born 1964), former Indian cricketer
Utpal Das (born 1986), Assamese film actor
Utpal Datta, Assamese film critic from Guwahati
Utpal Dholakia, Indian American researcher and professor
Utpal Dutt (1929–1993), Indian actor, director, and writer-playwright
Utpal V Nayanar (born 1959), Indian cinematographer and director from Kasaragod, Kerala
Utpal S. Tatu (born 1964), Indian molecular biologist, biochemist and a professor in the Indian Institute of Science

See also
Utpal Shanghvi Global School (USGS), a private school in J.V.P.D Scheme area of Juhu, Mumbai, India